Kovel is a surname. Notable people with the surname include

 Andi Kovel (born 1969), American artist and designer
 Joel Kovel (1936–2018), American eco-socialist author and academic
 Leonid Kovel (born 1986), Belarusian footballer
 Maksim Kovel (born 1999), Belarusian footballer
 Ralph and Terry Kovel, American authors